Josh Cameron (born October 17, 1986 in Portland, Oregon) is an American soccer player who last played for Portland Timbers in the USSF Division-2 Professional League.

Career

College
Cameron attended Centennial High School in Gresham, Oregon and played college soccer at Oregon State University, where he totaled four goals and 11 assists. During his collegiate career Cameron played defense, outside midfielder and forward, was a two-time Pac-10 All-Academic honorable mention selection, and guided the Beavers to a tie for fourth place in the 2008 Pac-10 championship. He also played club soccer for West Villa, Eastside United, Lake Oswego and Westside Metros, winning a U-12 state title with West Villa.

Professional
Cameron signed with the Portland Timbers in January 2009. He made his professional debut on June 13, 2009, as a substitute in a game against Charleston Battery, and scored his first professional goal on June 19, 2010 in a 2-0 win over the NSC Minnesota Stars.

References

External links
 Portland Timbers bio
 Oregon State Beavers bio

1986 births
Living people
Soccer players from Portland, Oregon
Association football midfielders
Oregon State Beavers men's soccer players
Portland Timbers (2001–2010) players
USL First Division players
USSF Division 2 Professional League players
American soccer players